The Mech (spelled Meche in Nepal; pronounced /mes/ or /meʃ/) is an ethnic group belonging to the Bodo-Kachari group of peoples. It is one of the scheduled tribes of India, listed both in West Bengal and Assam, India. They inhabit West Bengal, Nepal, Assam and Nagaland.

Etymology 
It has been suggested that mech is probably a corruption of the Sanskrit word mlechchha. Nevertheless, Stuart N. Wolfenden observed that some people do self-designate as Mech, So, he reconstructed Mech from Tibeto-Burman root "mi" means "man". Other authors have speculated that Meche is derived from the Mechi river because the Bodo-Kachari peoples in Nepal had settled around it; Mecha a region of the Bod country; and descendants of Mechel a legendary figure of Nepal.

Origin 
Bodo-Kachari peoples that migrated into present day India and gradually spread themselves into the whole of Assam, North Bengal and parts of East Bengal. It is said that, during their migration to India, they marched towards different directions. one group went along the river Brahmaputra and established themselves in the whole of Assam up to Goalpara district and parts of Jalpaiguri district and Cooch Behar district under the name of Bodo or Boro. Another group went towards the West along the foot of the Himalayas up to the river Mechi, bordering India and Nepal and settled on the North bank of the river known as Mechi or Mechia. Later they spread to Darjeeling Terai, Baikanthpur in Jalpaiguri district again marched further East and settled in the Dooars. It is said that, a group of Mech people, again moved further East, crossed the Sankosh river, and went towards Goalpara in Assam. Due to repeated floods in Dooars and eastern bank of Teesta river, many families migrated towards Assam.

History
The first record is found from the early 13th century in Tabaqat-i Nasiri, where they are mentioned along with the Koch and Tharu and are found to inhabit between the country of Tibet and Lakhanawati (Gauda). In Persian history, these three groups of people, the Koch, Mech and Tharu, possessed the physiognomy of the Turks and the Mongols  and their speech was different from the rest of the subcontinent. It is recorded that one Ali Mech, Mech chieftain, guided Bakhtiyar Khalji's army to invade Tibet via Kamarupa. 16th/17th century's Yogini Tantra states that Kuvacas were born of a Mech woman. According to Darrang Rajvamsavali of Koch kings and MS Chronicle collected by Buchanon Hamilton, Biswa Singha's father was a Mech and mother was a Koch. 19th and 20th century's scholars state that designation Mech is name applied to western section of Bodos by others and also to some extent by the people themselves.

Distribution

Mechs are  found in West Bengal and Assam in India, and in Nepal.

Demand of Mech-Kachari Autonomous Council
Presently, there are two types of Mech. One identify themselves with the Boro people and the other identify themselves separately as Mech-Kachari. The Mech-Kacharis want to preserve their language, culture and uplift their economic status; and so they have been demanding a Mech-Kachari autonomous council for some time.

Notable people  

 Ali Mech
 Kalicharan Brahma

Notes

References

Printed sources

Web-sources

Ethnic groups in India
Sino-Tibetan-speaking people
Tribes of West Bengal
Social groups of Assam
Social groups of West Bengal
Tribes of Assam